Mugaiyur is a state assembly constituency in Viluppuram district in Tamil Nadu. After delimitation of constituencies in 2009, it was reorganised into Tirukkoyilur constituency.

Members of Legislative Assembly

Election results

2006

2001

1996

1991

1989

1984

1980

1977

1971

1967

References

External links
 

Former assembly constituencies of Tamil Nadu
Viluppuram district